A Canadian Brazilian is a Brazilian person who is fully, partially or predominantly of Canadian descent, or a Canadian-born immigrant in Brazil. Many Canadians also travel to Brazil for work. From 1925 to 1968, over 11,631 Canadians had settled in Brazil.
Canada has always had a significant relationship with Brazil since the 1800s. The countries have had extensive interactions in the financing of infrastructure projects, particularly utilities. Brazil is the largest recipient of Canadian investment in South America and until 1974 was the venue for the largest single Canadian foreign investment. In 1991, Canadian investment in Brazil totalled around CANS 2 billion.

One of the more interesting aspects of Canadian–Brazilian relations is the quiet nature of the relationship, and a lack of interest in this relationship on the part of scholars in particular and Canadians in general.

To a Canadian, Brazil has meant coffee and Carnival, while to a Brazilian 'Canada is sometimes seen as a remote northern country, a pale reflection of the United States'.

Notable Canadian Brazilians
 Kevin Alves
 Walter Robert McAlister

See also
 Brazil–Canada relations
 Immigration to Brazil
 White Brazilians
 White Canadians
 Brazilian Canadians

References

 Buys, Barry Graham 1996, Canadians in Brazil: Brascan and Brazilian Development, ProQuest Dissertations Publishing.

Brazil
 
Ethnic groups in Brazil